Menippus is a genus of leaf beetles (Chrysomelidae).

Habitat and Environment 
This leaf beetle is mostly found in Australia, depending on the stringybark eucalyptus tree for food. The trees are also used to harbor eggs for future larvae.

Species 
Menippus contains the following species:
 Menippus aeneipennis Weise, 1892
 Menippus asahinai (Chûjô, 1962)
 Menippus beeneni Lee, Bezděk & Suenaga, 2012
 Menippus brevicornis (Jacoby, 1889)
 Menippus cervinus (Hope, 1831) (synonym: Menippus canellinus Fairmaire, 1889)
 Menippus clarki Jacoby, 1884
 Menippus cynicus Clark, 1864
 Menippus darcyi Reid & Nally, 2008
 Menippus dimidiaticornis (Jacoby, 1889)
 Menippus doeberli Suenaga, Lee & Bezděk, 2017
 Menippus ewani Reid & Nally, 2008
 Menippus fugitivus (Lea, 1926)
 Menippus gressitti Lee, Bezděk & Suenaga, 2012
 Menippus hsuehleeae Lee, Bezděk & Suenaga, 2012
 Menippus inconspicua (Jacoby, 1894)
 Menippus issikii (Chûjô, 1961)
 Menippus laterimaculata (Jacoby, 1886)
 Menippus marginipennis (Jacoby, 1894)
 Menippus metallicus Baly, 1886
 Menippus murzini Lee, Bezděk & Suenaga, 2012
 Menippus nepalensis Lee, Bezděk & Suenaga, 2012
 Menippus nigrocoeruleus Jacoby, 1886
 Menippus philippinensis Jacoby, 1894
 Menippus sakishimanus Suenaga, Lee & Bezděk, 2017
 Menippus sericea (Weise, 1889)
 Menippus sufi Reid & Nally, 2008
 Menippus viridis Duvivier, 1884
 Menippus yulensis (Jacoby, 1896)

References

Galerucinae
Chrysomelidae genera
Taxa named by Hamlet Clark